Matthew Coronato (born November 14, 2002) is an American collegiate ice hockey winger for Harvard University in the ECAC Hockey conference of the National Collegiate Athletic Association (NCAA). Coronato was selected by the Calgary Flames with the 13th overall pick in the 2021 NHL Entry Draft.

Early life
Coronato was born on November 14, 2002, in Huntington, New York to parents Samantha and Richard. He was born into an athletic family as his father played college lacrosse at the College of the Holy Cross and his younger brother Jake also played hockey. Coronato became interested in ice hockey after attending a New York Islanders game as a child.

Playing career

Amateur
Growing up in New York, Coronato played six seasons with the Long Island Royals in the Long Island Amateur Hockey League before entering prep school programs. He joined the New Jersey Colonials U14 program for the 2016–17 season where he ranked second on the team after accumulating 18 goals and 29 assists for 27 points through 21 games. Coronato then played with the Long Island Gulls for the 2017–18 season while also winning a New York Catholic State Championship as a Sophomore for St. Anthony’s High School in 2018. For the 2018-2019 season, he enrolled in the Salisbury School in Connecticut.  While attending the Salisbury School, Coronato announced his commitment to play for Harvard University. He was also drafted by the Chicago Steel of the United States Hockey League (USHL) in their 2018 Futures Draft.

USHL
After playing preparatory school hockey in Connecticut during the 2018–19 season, Coronato joined the Chicago Steel for the 2019–20 season. As a rookie with the Steel, Coronato tallied 18 goals and 22 assists for 40 points through 45 games in order to land fourth-most among USHL rookies. He also recorded a season-best nine consecutive games point streak between February 14 and March 7. As a result of his play, Coronato received the nickname 'Bison' in reference to how he'd bulldoze his way through opponents. He finished the season by earning a spot on the USHL's All-Rookie Second Team.

Coronato returned to the Steel for the 2020–21 season where he set multiple USHL and Steel franchise records. He began the season strong and led the league with 17 goals and 40 points through the first 19 games of the season. He also set a new USHL-record after having produced a point in all 19 games which included 13 multi-point games. As the season continued, Coronato recorded the highest single-season goal total ever recorded by a Steel player and later became Chicago's all-time leader in career goals. During Chicago's 2021 Clark Cup championship run, Coronato led all USHL skaters with nine goals and 13 points in eight games. As a result of his impressive season, Coronato was named the USHL's Forward of the Year and was selected for the All-USHL First Team.

Leading up to the 2021 NHL Entry Draft, the NHL Central Scouting Bureau ranked Coronato as the ninth-best eligible North American skater. On July 23, 2021, the Calgary Flames selected Coronato with the 13th overall pick in the 2021 draft.

Collegiate
Following the NHL draft, Coronato played in the All-American Game for 2021 Draft prospects before joining the Harvard Crimson for the 2021–22 season. Upon joining the team, Coronato tallied his first collegiate goal while shorthanded during a 9–3 win over Dartmouth on October 29. In the same game, he also scored another goal and added two assists for a four point night in the Crimsons' home opener. By early December, Coronato was recognized with an ECAC Hockey Rookie of the Week and was named to the United States' World Junior preliminary roster. As the regular-season concluded, Coronato scored two goals and two assists in a win over Clarkson that sent the Crimson into the ECAC championship game.

Career statistics

Regular season and playoffs

International

Awards and honors

References

External links 
 

2002 births
Living people
American ice hockey forwards
American people of Italian descent
Calgary Flames draft picks
Chicago Steel players
Harvard Crimson men's ice hockey players
National Hockey League first-round draft picks
Sportspeople from New York City
21st-century American people